Peter Wight may refer to:

Peter Wight (actor) (born 1950), English film and television actor
Peter Wight (cricketer) (1930–2015), Guyanese first-class cricketer who played for Somerset, Canterbury and British Guiana
Peter Bonnett Wight (1838–1925), American architect who worked in New York and Chicago
P. A. L. Wight (Peter Albert Laing Wight, 1924–1998), British veterinarian

See also
Peter White (disambiguation)